The 1937 Michigan State Spartans football team represented Michigan State College as an independent during the 1937 college football season. In their fifth season under head coach Charlie Bachman, the Spartans compiled an 8–2 record and won their annual rivalry game with Michigan by a 19 to 14 score. In inter-sectional play, the team defeated Kansas (16–0), Temple (13–6), Carnegie Tech (13–6), and San Francisco (14–0), but lost to Manhattan (3–0) and Auburn (6–0 in the 1938 Orange Bowl).

Halfback John Pingel was selected by the Associated Press (AP) as a second-team player, and by the International News Service (INS) and Central Press Association as a third-team player, on the 1937 College Football All-America Team.  Pingel was later inducted into the College Football Hall of Fame.

Schedule

References

Michigan State
Michigan State Spartans football seasons
Michigan State Spartans football